Timothy Gichere  is an Anglican bishop in Kenya: he has been Bishop of Mount Kenya Central since 2017.

References

21st-century Anglican bishops of the Anglican Church of Kenya
Anglican bishops of Mount Kenya Central
Year of birth missing (living people)
Living people